Shelby Flat is a former settlement in Nevada County, California. It lay at an elevation of 2664 feet (812 m).

References

Former settlements in Nevada County, California
Former populated places in California